Leccinum arbuticola is a species of bolete fungus in the family Boletaceae. It was described as new to science in 1975 by mycologist Harry Delbert Thiers, from collections made in Nevada County, California. It grows in association with madrone (Arbutus menziesii).

See also
List of Leccinum species
List of North American boletes

References

External links
Leccinum arbuticola at California boletes

Fungi described in 1975
Fungi of the United States
arbuticola
Fungi without expected TNC conservation status
Fungi of California